Molegbe is a commune in the city of Gbadolite, the provincial capital of Nord-Ubangi province, in the Democratic Republic of Congo.  Its inhabitants speak ngbandi.

References 

Populated places in the province of Équateur
Communes of the Democratic Republic of the Congo